Benjamin Rush (1811–1877) was an American lawyer and writer.

Life 
Benjamin Rush, grandson of the more famous Benjamin, and son of Richard Rush, was born in Philadelphia on January 23, 1811. He was graduated from Princeton College in 1829; was admitted to the bar in 1833; became, in 1887, secretary of the United States legation in London, and for a time acted as chargé d'affaires there. He died in Paris on June 30, 1877.

Works 

 An Appeal for the Union (Philadelphia, 1860; 1861); 
 Letters on the Rebellion (1862).

References

Sources 

 White, James Terry, ed. (1893). "Rush, Benjamin (2)". The National Cyclopaedia of American Biography. Vol. 3. New York: James T. White & Co. p. 333. 
 Wilson, J. G.; Fiske, J., eds. (1900). "Rush, Benjamin (2)". Appletons' Cyclopædia of American Biography. Vol. 5. Rev. ed. New York: D. Appleton & Co. p. 350. 

1811 births
1877 deaths
American lawyers
American writers